Gibson is an unincorporated community in Wagoner County, Oklahoma, United States. It is located on Oklahoma State Highway 16, approximately six miles south of Wagoner and 2 1/2 miles northwest of Okay. The Gibson Station was the first passenger and freight station built in Indian Territory, now Oklahoma, constructed in 1872 by the Missouri–Kansas–Texas Railroad.

References

Unincorporated communities in Oklahoma
Unincorporated communities in Wagoner County, Oklahoma